Lightning Reporter is a 1926 American silent drama film directed by John W. Noble and starring Johnnie Walker, Sylvia Breamer and Burr McIntosh.

Cast
 Johnnie Walker as Jimmy Blaine - Cub Reporter 
 Sylvia Breamer as Ruth Barlow
 Burr McIntosh as Mr. Barlow - Ruth's Father
 Lou Archer		
 Nelson McDowell	
 Joseph W. Girard
 Mayme Kelso

References

Bibliography
 Munden, Kenneth White. The American Film Institute Catalog of Motion Pictures Produced in the United States, Part 1. University of California Press, 1997.

External links
 

1926 films
1926 drama films
1920s English-language films
American silent feature films
Silent American drama films
American black-and-white films
Films directed by John W. Noble
1920s American films